Forward Music is a Lebanon based independent record label specializing in World Music.

History 
Forward Music was established in 2001 by Ghazi Abdel Baki as a music label that pools together the cooperative efforts of young artists from the Middle East. It aims to encourage new and creative trends in the musical arts, blending the various cultural currents that meet and interact in new fusions and fresh perspectives. It hopes to draw on the rich musical past of the Arab world and the array of contemporary influences to find new musical dialects. Forward Music is committed to making an authentic contribution to our ever-changing culture and to the growing global dialogue of World Music.

Today, Forward Music is a leading independent label that produces and distributes the work of several respected musicians and singers in the Middle East.

In 2007, one of Forward Music's projects, "Al Muwashahat", received The BBC Awards for world music .

In October 2010, Forward Music acquired 13 album licenses from the record label Incognito, further expanding its music catalogue.

Later, In 2011, Forward Music opened its state of the art Live concert venue in Beirut: The Democratic republic of Music (DRM). DRM hosted 300 concerts in the span of 3 years with artists such as: Stanley Jordan, Tony Allen (musician), The Musicians of the Nile, Henri Texier, Souad Massi, The Herbaliser, Ilham al-Madfai, Joey DeFrancesco,  and many others  including the label's artists and a myriad of musicians from Syria, Egypt, Tunisia, Jordan, Iraq, and Lebanon.

List of current artists 

Charbel Rouhana
Lena Chamamyan
Soumaya Baalbaki
Ghazi Abdel Baki
Issa Ghandour
Mustafa Said
Ziad El Ahmadie

Discography 

Watad,  Ghazi Abdel Baki
Ila Mata, Charbel Rouhana
Handmade, Charbel Rouhana
Arabtango, Soumaya Baalbaki
Rubaiyat El Khayyam, Mustafa Said
"Ghazi Abdel Baki LIVE", Ghazi Abdel Baki
Beirut Good Vibes - Vol.1, Various
Handmade DVD, Charbel Rouhana
Darwish, Issa Ghandour and the Madina Band
The Last Communique, Ghazi Abdel Baki
Doux Zen, Charbel Rouhana
The Collection, Lena Chamamyan
Hal Asmar Elone, Lena Chamamyan
Shamat, Lena Chamamyan
Cotton Candy, Lena Chamamyan
Communique # 1, Ghazi Abdel Baki
Madinatuna, Paul Salem
Oyoun el Bakar, Ziyad Sahhab
World Music From Lebanon - Vol.1 (3 CD box set), Various
We Live, Various
Dangerous, Charbel Rouhana
Faces, Ibrahim Jaber Gros Bras
Sourat Trait d'Union, Charbel Rouhana
Communique # 2, Ghazi Abdel Baki
Keep On Singing, Ziyad Sahhab
World Music From Lebanon - Vol.2 (2 CD box set), Various
World Music From Lebanon - Vol.3 (2 CD box set), Various
Fareeq ElAtrash, Fareeq El Atrash
Silent Wave, Ziad Al-Ahmadieh
Bilbal, Ziad Al-Ahmadieh
Beyond Traditions, Ziad Al-Ahmadieh
Things That I Miss, Hazem Shaheen
Hewar, Hewar
El Aysh Wel Melh, Masar
The Taqalid Series (6 CD box set), Various
Asil, Asil Ensemble & Mustafa Said
The Annunciation, Nida Abou Mrad & The Arabic Classical Ensemble
Wisal, Nida Abou Mrad &The Arabic Classical Ensemble
Wasalat, Nida Abou Mrad &The Arabic Classical Ensemble
Tajwid, Sheikh Salah Yammout
Insan, Twais
Taqalid Sampler, Various
Khameer, Basel Rajoub

References 

Lebanese independent record labels
Record label distributors
World music record labels
Record labels established in 2001
2001 establishments in Lebanon
Mass media in Beirut